Kansanga is a neighborhood in Kampala, the capital and largest city of Uganda.

Location
Kansanga is bordered by Kabalagala and Kisugu to the north, Muyenga to the north-east, Kiwafu to the east, Bbunga to the south-east, Konge to the south, Lukuli to the south-west, Kibuye to the west, and Nsambya to the north-west. The coordinates of Kansanga are 0°17'14.0"N, 32°36'28.0"E (Latitude:0.287225; Longitude:32.607778).

Overview
During the 1950s and 1960s, Kansanga was primarily a middle-class residential neighborhood. During the 1990s, the neighborhood transformed into an upscale residential area and began to accommodate corporate entities like Kampala International University and the International University of East Africa. The area is cosmopolitan, with Internet cafes, residential apartments, upscale residential estates, and, as one proceeds north along the Ggaba Road, Kansanga merges into Kabalagala, with its restaurants, bars, and nightclubs.

Points of interest
The points of interest within or near Kansanga include: (a) the Main Campus of Kampala International University, a private university (b) Kansanga Miracle Center, a place of worship, affiliated with the Pentecostal Movement (c) Our Lady of Mount Carmel Catholic Church (d) Kivebulaaya Protestant Church (e) Kansanga Islamic Mosque (f) Rainbow International School and (g) the main campus of International University of East Africa, another private university.

See also
 Ggaba
 Muyenga
 Makindye Division

References

External links
 HomeHippo Guide To Kansanga

Neighborhoods of Kampala
Makindye Division